List of the main battles in the history of the Ottoman Empire are shown below. The life span of the empire was more than six centuries, and the maximum territorial extent, at the zenith of its power in the second half of the 16th century, stretched from central Europe to the Persian Gulf and from the Caspian Sea to North Africa. The number of battles the empire fought is quite high. But here only the more important battles are listed. Among these, the battles fought in the 20th century (Turco-Italian War, Balkan Wars, and World War I ) as well as the sieges (like the sieges of Constantinople, Cairo, Belgrade, Bagdad, etc.) which most lists include as battles are not shown except in cases where the siege is followed by a battle (i.e. Vienna, Khotyn, Plevna).

List of battles

(Color legend for the location of the battle)

The sultans of the Ottoman Empire participated in some of the battles listed above. For those battles see List of the Ottoman battles in which the sultan participated

See also 
List of wars involving the Ottoman Empire
List of Ottoman battles in the 20th century
List of Ottoman battles in the World War I
List of treaties of the Ottoman Empire
List of Turkic dynasties and countries

Notes

References

 
Ottoman Empire military-related lists
Ottoman Empire-related lists
Ottoman